The Royton Branch was a mile-long Lancashire & Yorkshire Railway built double track branch railway line in Greater Manchester, England, that ran from  (renamed Royton in 1978) on the Oldham Loop Line to .

History

Opening
Royton Station opened on 21 March 1864 by the Lancashire & Yorkshire Railway to link the mill town of Royton to their rail network.

Ownership changes
Passing in 1923 to the London Midland & Scottish Railway it was considered for electrification in 1924 but those plans were shelved. In 1948 the line was nationalised becoming part of British Railways London Midland Region who ran the line until it fell foul of the Beeching cuts.

Closure
The line closed to freight on 2 November 1964, and passengers on 16 April 1966, officially closing on 18 April.

Accidents
Although a short line, it was well-used but poorly maintained. This led to a number of accidents, the most serious being a collision on 31 October 1908 that killed a fireman, and on 8 February 1961 when a train derailed at Royton hitting local houses but fortunately causing only minor injuries.

References

External links
Royton station and line history
British Railways in 1960 - Royton Junction to Royton
Description and pictures of the 1961 crash

Closed railway lines in North West England
Rail transport in Greater Manchester
Beeching closures in England
Railway lines closed in 1966
Railway lines opened in 1864